Esli (Russian for "If") was a Russian science fiction literary magazine. It was started in 1991 in Moscow, as a publisher of foreign SF stories, but soon broadened its format to include Russophone writers as well. In the 2000s, Esli also started publishing fantasy short stories and articles on futurology.

The magazine won the European Science Fiction Award (Eurocon award) for best science fiction magazine in 2000. Esli closed down by the end of 2012 due to retailing problems.

In late 2015, the magazine was relaunched with a new team and a new, futurology-centered subject. It was suspended again in the late 2016.

See also
 If, American science fiction magazine launched in March 1952

External links
  Website

1991 establishments in Russia
2016 disestablishments in Russia
Bi-monthly magazines
Defunct magazines published in Russia
Magazines established in 1991
Magazines disestablished in 2016
Magazines published in Moscow
Russian-language magazines
Science fiction magazines published in Russia
Science fiction magazines established in the 1990s